Uido Truija (born in 1944) is an Estonian lawyer and writer.

He was born in Vastseliina, Võrumaa, and graduated from Tallinn Maritime School as a shipmaster.

Uido Truija acquired his academic education in Moscow Juridical Distance Learning Institute in the faculty of law.

He has sailed seas from Arctic to Antarctic; has been engaged in Soviet Union`s state-organized fish poaching on the coast of West Africa and in Antarctic waters; has given a practical short course on building socialism in Angola, Mauritania and several other African countries; acquainted with the construction of socialism with a "human face" in China and modest capitalism in Argentina.
In addition to the above: marine practice instructor at Pärnu Marine School, 1st class driver (ambulance), 1st class diver, 1st class lawyer; sailed on the beautiful river Emajõgi as a helmsman on the cruise ship Raketa with underwater wings on the Tartu - Pihkva line; has worked as a prosecutor`s office investigator, prosecutor, economic lawyer and lawyer. 
Has taken an active part in the restoration of capitalism in Estonia; organized and advised cooperatives, joint-stock companies, banks, insurances, tourism and industrial companies, parties, privatization and expropriation figures and advised bankruptcy masters.

Works by Uido Truija
 Eesti aastal 2044 (Estonia in the year 2044, 1994)
 Elu planeedil Maa (Life on Planet Earth, 2001)
 Vanad roomlased Tallinnas (Old Romans in Tallinn, 2002)
 Liivimaa neitsi (Maiden of Livonia, 2004)
 Popullo (2005)
 Kurzeme printsess (Princess of Kurzeme, 2006)
 Idataevasse kerkib Veevalaja (Aquarius Rises to the Eastern Sky, 2008)
  (Sea Salty Lips, 2008)
  (Sea Salty Lips. Second book, 2009)
  (Sea Salty Lips. Third book, 2010)
 Pisaraterajal huika mind videvikusorrina, mu arm (On a Trail of Tears Hoot Me as a Night Hawk, My Love, 2010)
 Kui võim läheb hulluks (When Power Goes Mad, 2012)
 Оплеуха человечеству (Slap in the Face of Mankind, 1999)
 Geopoliitiline katastroof (Geopolitical Catastrophe, 2014)
 Emotsioonide vang (Imprisoned by Emotions, 1999)
 Mul suri koer ära (My Dog is Dead, 2014)
 Lubadus (Promise. A Short Story à la Chekhov, 2014)
 Sotsialistlik seaduslikkus ja armastus (The Socialist Legality and Love. A short story, 2014)
 Punane terror valgub üle riigipiiri (Red Terror Spills Across the State Border, 2015)
  2005-2015. ("Flakes of Poetry". Poems from the works of Uido Truija 2005 - 2015)
 "Taevatee haigla langeb koomasse" (The Hospital of Heaven's Path Falls Into a Coma, 2017)
 "Eesti presidendi teekond" (The Route of the Estonian President, 2018)
 "Eesti Vabariigi presidendi Konstantin Pätsi vanglapäevik" (Konstantin Päts, President of the Republic of Estonia. A Prison Diary 2019)
 "Kangelasliku Seltsimees Majori juhtumised KGB teenistuses kommunismiehitamisepäevil" (The Curious Cases of Heroic Comrade Major at the Services of KGB in the Days of Communism, 2020)
 "Kompartei sekretäri juubel" (Anniversary of the Secretary of the Communist Party); A short story, "Fate & Secrets" magazine, March 2021.
 "Mürsuplahvatuse järelkaja" (Shell Explosion Aftermath); A short story, "Fate & Secrets" magazine, April-May 2021.
 "Samovarivaras" (The Samovar Thief); A short story, Nelli Teataja magazine, 1st of April 2021.
 "Massvaktsineerimine" (Mass Vaccination); A short story, Nelli Teataja Newspaper, 16th of April 2021.
 "Sinise Põrssa Pubi" (Blue Piglet Pub); A short story, "Fate & Secrets" magazine, June 2021.
 " Kaos saabub homme, hiljemalt ülehomme"; " Eesti aastal 2044" ( "Chaos will be there tomorrow or the day after tomorrow, at the latest"; "Estonia in the year 2044"), author`s edition, 2021.
 "Kaos saabub homme, hiljemalt ülehomme" ("Chaos will be there tomorrow or the day after tomorrow, at the latest"), 2022.
 "Infosõja agendid planeedil Maa" ("The agents of information war on planet Earth"), author`s edition. 2022.
 "Mina ei ole mina" ("I am not me"), author`s edition, 2023.

Publications 
 Hagiavaldus kohtusse: käsiraamat (Statement of Claim to the Court, 1999)
 Kaebus halduskohtusse (Appeal to an Administrative Court, 2000)
 Võlaõigus ettevõtluses (Law of Obligations in Business Activity, 2001)
 Võlaõigusseadus ja selle rakendamine: käsiraamat (Law of Obligations Act and Its Application: Handbook, 2002)
 Lepingute kogumik: praktiline käsiraamat (Collection of Contracts: Practical Handbook, 2002)
 Hagide ja kaebuste esitamine kohtusse (Filing an Action to Court, 2003)
 Hagimenetlus tsiviilasjas (Action of Proceeding Concerning a Civil Matter, 2006)

Reviews
 Jan Kaus. Lennata või roomata? Teadvuses või reaalsuses? (To Fly or to Crawl? In Consciousness or in Reality?) – Looming nr. 3 (2003), p 399–425. (Overview of Estonian prose in 2002)
 Jüri Kallas. Täitsa tavaline ulmeaasta (Completely Ordinary Year of Science Fiction) – Looming nr. 3 (2003), p 426–431. (Overview of Estonian science fiction in 2002)
 Mihkel Mutt. Eesti kirjandus kui pretensioon.vandenõu.com (Estonian Literature as pretension.conspiracy.com) – Looming nr 3 (2007), p 431-454. (Overview of Estonian prose in 2006)

External links
 Uido Truija in Estonian science fiction database – BAAS
 Uido Truija – Works

Estonian male writers
20th-century Estonian lawyers
1944 births
Living people
Date of birth missing (living people)
20th-century Estonian writers
21st-century Estonian writers